The Château d'Angers is a castle in the city of Angers in the Loire Valley, in the département of Maine-et-Loire, in France. Founded in the 9th century by the Counts of Anjou, it was expanded to its current size in the 13th century. It is located overhanging the river Maine. It is a listed historical monument since 1875. Now open to the public, the Château d'Angers is home of the Apocalypse Tapestry.

History
Originally, the Château d'Angers was built as a fortress at a site inhabited by the Romans because of its strategic defensive location.

In the 9th century, the Bishop of Angers gave the Counts of Anjou permission to build a castle in Angers. The construction of the first castle begun under Count Fulk III (970–1040), celebrated for his construction of dozens of castles, who built it to protect Anjou from the Normans. It became part of the Angevin Empire of the Plantagenet Kings of England during the 12th century. In 1204, the region was conquered by Philip II and the new castle was constructed during the minority of his grandson, Louis IX ("Saint Louis") in the early part of the 13th century. Louis IX rebuilt the castle in whitestone and black slate, with 17 semicircular towers. The construction undertaken in 1234 cost 4,422 livres, roughly one per cent of the estimated royal revenue at the time. Louis gave the castle to his brother, Charles in 1246.

In 1352, King John II le Bon, gave the castle to his second son, Louis who later became count of Anjou. Married to the daughter of the wealthy Duke of Brittany, Louis had the castle modified, and in 1373 commissioned the famous Apocalypse Tapestry from the painter Hennequin de Bruges and the Parisian tapestry-weaver Nicolas Bataille. Louis II (Louis I's son) and Yolande d'Aragon added a chapel (1405–12) and royal apartments to the complex. The chapel is a sainte chapelle, the name given to churches which enshrined a relic of the Passion. The relic at Angers was a splinter of the fragment of the True Cross which had been acquired by Louis IX.

In the early 15th century, the hapless dauphin who, with the assistance of Joan of Arc would become King Charles VII, had to flee Paris and was given sanctuary at the Château d' Angers.

In 1562, Catherine de' Medici had the castle restored as a powerful fortress, but, her son, Henry III, reduced the height of the towers and had the towers and walls stripped of their embattlements; Henry III used the castle stones to build streets and develop the village of Angers. Nonetheless, under threat of attacks from the Huguenots, the king maintained the castle's defensive capabilities by making it a military outpost and by installing artillery on the château's upper terraces.  At the end of the 18th century, as a military garrison, it showed its worth when its thick walls withstood a massive bombardment by cannons from the Vendean army. Unable to do anything else, the invaders simply gave up.

A military academy was established in the castle to train young officers in the strategies of war. Arthur Wellesley, 1st Duke of Wellington, best known for taking part in the defeat of Napoleon Bonaparte at the Battle of Waterloo, was trained at the Military Academy of Angers. The academy was moved to Saumur and the castle was used for the rest of the 19th century as a prison, powder magazine, and barracks.

Modern

The castle continued to be used as an armory through the First and Second World Wars. It was severely damaged during World War II  by the Nazis when an ammunition storage dump inside the castle exploded.

On 10 January 2009, the castle suffered severe damage from an accidental fire due to short-circuiting. The Tapestries of the Apocalypse were not damaged. Total damages have been estimated at 2 million Euros. According to Christine Albanel, the Minister of Culture, the expected date of completion for the restoration was the second trimester of 2009.

Today, owned by the City of Angers, the massive, austere castle has been converted to a museum housing the oldest and largest collection of medieval tapestries in the world, with the 14th-century "Apocalypse Tapestry" as one of its priceless treasures. As a tribute to its fortitude, the castle has never been taken by any invading force in history.

Layout

Each of the perimeter towers measures  in diameter. Two pairs of towers form the city and landward entrances of the château. Each of the towers was once  in height, but they were later cut down for the use of artillery pieces. The Tour du Moulin is the only tower which conserves the original elevation.

Gallery

See also
 Loire Valley
 List of castles in France
 Apocalypse Tapestry on the French Wikipedia

Citations

General references 
 .
 .
 .
 .

Further reading
.
.

External links

 Château d'Angers - City of Angers
 Official tourism site
 
 
 Castle of Angers in Google Cultural Institute
 The forgotten French tapestry with lessons for our apocalyptic times, The Guardian, April 17, 2020

Castles in Pays de la Loire
Chateau d'Angers
Châteaux in Maine-et-Loire
Museums in Maine-et-Loire
Historic house museums in Pays de la Loire
Buildings and structures completed in the 9th century
Buildings and structures completed in the 13th century
Monuments historiques of Pays de la Loire
Monuments of the Centre des monuments nationaux
Royal residences in France